The Chemical Building is a historic wastewater treatment building at Field's Point Wastewater Treatment Facility in Providence, Rhode Island. Built in 1900–01, it is one of the two oldest buildings at Providence's main sewage treatment facility. The long facades are divided into 9 bays, separated by brick piers. When originally built, the structure had a concrete first floor, a wooden second floor, and a loft area accessed by catwalks, and was used to hold and deliver chemicals used to neutralize the wastewater arriving via the Ernest Street Sewage Pumping Station. In the 1930s the plant was converted to use an active sludge process, and the interior of the building was altered to be a single large chamber.

The building was listed on the National Register of Historic Places in 1989.

See also
National Register of Historic Places listings in Providence, Rhode Island

References

Industrial buildings and structures on the National Register of Historic Places in Rhode Island
Infrastructure completed in 1900
Sewerage infrastructure on the National Register of Historic Places
Sewage treatment plants in the United States
Buildings and structures in Providence, Rhode Island
National Register of Historic Places in Providence, Rhode Island
1900 establishments in Rhode Island